Gvozdenović (Cyrillic script: Гвозденовић) may refer to:

People
Anto Gvozdenović (1853–1935), Montenegrin, Russian, and French general, a member of the Imperial Russian Privy Council, diplomat and statesman
Branimir Gvozdenović (born 1961), Montenegrin politician
Ivan Gvozdenović (born 1978), Serbian football (soccer) defender who plays for FK Vojvodina
Miodrag Gvozdenović (1945–2021), Montenegrin volleyball player
Nedeljko Gvozdenović (1902–1988), Serbian painter

Places
Gvozdenović (Ub), a village in Serbia

See also
 Gvozdanović

Serbian surnames
Montenegrin surnames